Ryanodine receptors (RyR for short) form a class of intracellular calcium channels in various forms of excitable animal tissue like muscles and neurons.
There are three major isoforms of the ryanodine receptor, which are found in different tissues and participate in different signaling pathways involving calcium release from intracellular organelles. The RYR2 ryanodine receptor isoform is the major cellular mediator of calcium-induced calcium release (CICR) in animal cells.

Etymology 

The ryanodine receptors are named after the plant alkaloid ryanodine which shows a high affinity to them.

Isoforms 

There are multiple isoforms of ryanodine receptors: 
 RyR1 is primarily expressed in skeletal muscle
 RyR2 is primarily expressed in myocardium (heart muscle)
 RyR3 is expressed more widely, but especially in the brain.
 Non-mammalian vertebrates typically express two RyR isoforms, referred to as RyR-alpha and RyR-beta.
 Many invertebrates, including the model organisms Drosophila melanogaster (fruitfly) and Caenorhabditis elegans, only have a single isoform. In non-metazoan species, calcium-release channels with sequence homology to RyRs can be found, but they are shorter than the mammalian ones and may be closer to IP3 Receptors.

Physiology 

Ryanodine receptors mediate the release of calcium ions from the sarcoplasmic reticulum and endoplasmic reticulum, an essential step in muscle contraction. In skeletal muscle, activation of ryanodine receptors occurs via a physical coupling to the dihydropyridine receptor (a voltage-dependent, L-type calcium channel), whereas, in cardiac muscle, the primary mechanism of activation is calcium-induced calcium release, which causes calcium outflow from the sarcoplasmic reticulum.

It has been shown that calcium release from a number of ryanodine receptors in a ryanodine receptor cluster results in a spatiotemporally restricted rise in cytosolic calcium that can be visualised as a calcium spark. Ryanodine receptors are very close to mitochondria and calcium release from RyR has been shown to regulate ATP production in heart and pancreas cells.

Ryanodine receptors are similar to the inositol trisphosphate (IP3) receptor, and stimulated to transport Ca2+ into the cytosol by recognizing Ca2+ on its cytosolic side, thus establishing a positive feedback mechanism; a small amount of Ca2+ in the cytosol near the receptor will cause it to release even more Ca2+ (calcium-induced calcium release/CICR). However, as the concentration of intracellular Ca2+ rises, this can trigger closing of RyR, preventing the total depletion of SR. This finding therefore indicates that a plot of opening probability for RyR as a function of Ca2+ concentration is a bell-curve. Furthermore, RyR can sense the Ca2+ concentration inside the ER/SR and spontaneously open in a process known as store overload-induced calcium release (SOICR).

RyRs are especially important in neurons and muscle cells. In heart and pancreas cells, another second messenger (cyclic ADP-ribose) takes part in the receptor activation.

The localized and time-limited activity of Ca2+ in the cytosol is also called a Ca2+ wave. The building of the wave is done by 
 the feedback mechanism of the ryanodine receptor
 the activation of phospholipase C by GPCR or RTK, which leads to the production of inositol trisphosphate, which in turn activates the InsP3 receptor.

Associated proteins 

RyRs form docking platforms for a multitude of proteins and small molecule ligands.
The cardiac-specific isoform of the receptor (RyR2) is known to form a quaternary complex with luminal calsequestrin, junctin, and triadin. Calsequestrin has multiple Ca2+ binding sites and binds Ca2+ ions with very low affinity so they can be easily released.

Pharmacology 

Antagonists:
Ryanodine locks the RyRs at half-open state at nanomolar concentrations, yet fully closes them at micromolar concentration.
Dantrolene the clinically used antagonist
Ruthenium red
procaine, tetracaine, etc. (local anesthetics)
Activators:
Agonist: 4-chloro-m-cresol and suramin are direct agonists, i.e., direct activators.
Xanthines like caffeine and pentifylline activate it by potentiating sensitivity to native ligand Ca.
Physiological agonist: Cyclic ADP-ribose can act as a physiological gating agent. It has been suggested that it may act by making FKBP12.6 (12.6 kilodalton FK506 binding protein, as opposed to 12 kDa FKBP12 which binds to RyR1) which normally bind (and blocks) RyR2 channel tetramer in an average stoichiometry of 3.6, to fall off RyR2 (which is the predominant RyR in pancreatic beta cells, cardiomyocytes and smooth muscles).

A variety of other molecules may interact with and regulate ryanodine receptor. For example: dimerized Homer physical tether linking inositol trisphosphate receptors (IP3R) and ryanodine receptors on the intracellular calcium stores with cell surface group 1 metabotropic glutamate receptors and the Alpha-1D adrenergic receptor

Ryanodine 

The plant alkaloid ryanodine, for which this receptor was named, has become an invaluable investigative tool. It can block the phasic release of calcium, but at low doses may not block the tonic cumulative calcium release. The binding of ryanodine to RyRs is use-dependent, that is the channels have to be in the activated state. At low (<10 micromolar, works even at nanomolar) concentrations, ryanodine binding locks the RyRs into a long-lived subconductance (half-open) state and eventually depletes the store, while higher (~100 micromolar) concentrations irreversibly inhibit channel-opening.

Caffeine 

RyRs are activated by millimolar caffeine concentrations. High (greater than 5 mmol/L) caffeine concentrations cause a pronounced increase (from micromolar to picomolar) in the sensitivity of RyRs to Ca2+ in the presence of caffeine, such that basal Ca2+ concentrations become activatory. At low millimolar caffeine concentrations, the receptor opens in a quantal way, but has complicated behavior in terms of repeated use of caffeine or dependence on cytosolic or luminal calcium concentrations.

Role in disease 

RyR1 mutations are associated with malignant hyperthermia and central core disease. RyR2 mutations play a role in stress-induced polymorphic ventricular tachycardia (a form of cardiac arrhythmia) and ARVD. It has also been shown that levels of type RyR3 are greatly increased in PC12 cells overexpressing mutant human Presenilin 1, and in brain tissue in knockin mice that express mutant Presenilin 1 at normal levels, and thus may play a role in the pathogenesis of neurodegenerative diseases, like Alzheimer's disease.

The presence of antibodies against ryanodine receptors in blood serum has also been associated with myasthenia gravis.

Sudden cardiac death in several young individuals in the Amish community (four of which were from the same family) was traced to homozygous duplication of a mutant RyR2 (Ryanodine Receptor) gene. Normal (wild type) ryanodine receptors are involved in CICR in heart and other muscles, and RyR2 functions primarily in the myocardium (heart muscle).

Structure
RyR1 cryo-EM structure revealed a large cytosolic assembly built on an extended α-solenoid scaffold connecting key regulatory domains to the pore. The RyR1 pore architecture shares the general structure of the six-transmembrane ion channel superfamily. A unique domain inserted between the second and third transmembrane helices interacts intimately with paired EF-hands originating from the α-solenoid scaffold, suggesting a mechanism for channel gating by Ca2+.

See also 
 Ryanoid, a class of insecticide that act through ryanodine receptors

References

External links 
 

Transmembrane receptors
Calcium channels